Seigler Mountain is a mountain in the Mayacamas Mountains of the Northern California Coast Ranges.
It is in Lake County, California.

Name

The mountain is named after Thomas Seigler, who discovered the Seigler Springs to the east of the mountain, where a resort grew up by the 1870s.

Physical

The mountain is in Lake County, California.
The nearest higher neighbor is Mount Hannah to the WNW.

Location

Seigler Mountain is one of the mountains in the Cobb Mountain Area, which have a volcanic origin.
Others are Cobb Mountain, the most dominant, Mount Hannah and Boggs Mountain.
There are isolated small valleys and basins between the mountain peaks.
Seigler Mountain is separated from Mount Hannah by Salminas Basin, a large mountain meadow with an unusual complex of wetlands that feeds Cole Creek.
The mountain was volcanically active 600,000 years ago, and flows from the mountain overlaid white bedded tuff to the north of Howard Springs.

Ecology

A delimitation survey published in 2020 found that Seigler Mountain was infested by Mediterranean oak borers (Xyleborus monographus), a type of non-native invasive beetle that mainly attacks oak species.
In California it most often attacks valley oak, and less often attacks blue oak.

Notes

Sources

 

Mountains of Lake County, California
Mayacamas Mountains